Marcos José Giménez (born 12 April 1989) is an Argentine professional footballer who plays as a midfielder for Brown de Adrogué.

Career
Giménez's senior career began in 2007 in the ranks of Primera B Metropolitana's Talleres. After seven goals, including four during his last season of 2008–09 which concluded with relegation, in fifty-eight matches, Giménez left the club in July 2009 to join All Boys of Primera B Nacional. A forty-four minute cameo against Deportivo Merlo on 5 March 2010 was the midfielder's only appearance for All Boys. Moves to third tier sides Tristán Suárez and Temperley followed up until 2012, with Giménez appearing thirty-nine times and scoring four goals. Giménez spent the 2012–13 Primera B Metropolitana campaign with San Telmo.

In June 2013, Giménez completed a return to Talleres; now playing their football in Primera C Metropolitana. He remained with them for four years, featuring in over one hundred fixtures as they won their place back to Primera B Metropolitana in 2015. On 16 July 2017, Giménez joined Defensores de Belgrano. He netted his first goal during the promotion play-offs against former club Tristán Suárez on 15 May 2018, on their way to securing promotion to Primera B Nacional. In February 2022, Giménez moved to Atlético de Rafaela.

Ahead of the 2022 season, Giménez officially joined Primera Nacional side Brown de Adrogué.

Career statistics
.

References

External links

1989 births
Living people
Sportspeople from Lanús
Argentine footballers
Association football midfielders
Primera B Metropolitana players
Primera Nacional players
Primera C Metropolitana players
Talleres de Remedios de Escalada footballers
All Boys footballers
CSyD Tristán Suárez footballers
Club Atlético Temperley footballers
San Telmo footballers
Defensores de Belgrano footballers
Atlético de Rafaela footballers
Club Atlético Brown footballers